Le Saint prend l'affût is a French adventure drama film from 1966. It was directed by Christian-Jaque, written by Jean Ferry, starring Jean Marais.

Cast 
 Jean Marais as Simon Templar
 Jess Hahn as Hoppy Uniatz
 Jean Yanne as Mueller-Strasse
 Danièle Évenou as Sophie Chartier
 Raffaella Carrà as Mrs Anita Pavone
 Tiberio Murgia as Tonio Cotone
 Henri Virlogeux as Oscar Chartier
 Claudio Gora as Cesare Pavone
 Nerio Bernardi
 Darío Moreno
 Maria Brockerhoff as Monica
 Roger Carel as The professor
 Reinhard Kolldehoff as Schmutz
 Carlo Pisacane as Agatino Camaleonte
 Siegfried Rauch as Johnny K.W. Mest

Production
The film was known under the title The Saint Lies in Wait (USA),  (Italy),  (West Germany),  (Portugal).

During the making of the film, the stunt arranger Gil Delamare was killed.

References

External links 
 
 Le Saint prend l'affût (1966) at Films de France

1966 films
French adventure drama films
1960s French-language films
Films directed by Christian-Jaque
1960s adventure drama films
Films based on British novels
Films scored by Gérard Calvi
1966 drama films
1960s French films